Castle's moray (Gymnothorax castlei) is a moray eel found in coral reefs in the western central Pacific Ocean. It was first named by E.B. Böhlke and J.E. Randall in 1999.

References

castlei
Fish described in 1999